Troy Chimneys is a 1953 historical novel by the British writer Margaret Kennedy. It was awarded the James Tait Black Memorial Prize for Fiction.

Synopsis
While recovering from illness, a Victorian gentleman decides to read the diaries of his Regency Era ancestor Miles Lufton.

References

Bibliography
 Hammill, Faye. Women, Celebrity, and Literary Culture Between the Wars. University of Texas Press, 2007.
 Vinson, James. Twentieth-Century Romance and Gothic Writers. Macmillan, 1982.
 Wallace, Diana. The Woman's Historical Novel: British Women Writers, 1900-2000. Springer, 2004.

1953 British novels
British historical novels
Novels by Margaret Kennedy
Novels set in England
Novels set in the 19th century
Macmillan Publishers books